is a Japanese sprint canoeist, born in Shizuoka Prefecture. She won silver and bronze medal in the women's kayak doubles and four at the 2010 Asian Games in Guangzhou, China, respectively. Ōmura is also a member of the canoe and kayak team at Waseda University in Shinjuku, and is coached and trained by Octavian Ispas of Romania.

Ōmura represented Japan at the 2012 Summer Olympics in London, where she competed in the women's K-2 500 metres. Ōmura and her partner Shinobu Kitamoto failed to advance into the semi-finals, as they placed sixth in the second heat by approximately two seconds behind the Slovakian pair Ivana Kmeťová and Martina Kohlová, with a time of 1:47.323.

References

External links
NBC Olympics Profile

1989 births
Japanese female canoeists
Living people
Olympic canoeists of Japan
Canoeists at the 2012 Summer Olympics
Asian Games medalists in canoeing
Canoeists at the 2010 Asian Games
Canoeists at the 2014 Asian Games
Asian Games silver medalists for Japan
Asian Games bronze medalists for Japan
Medalists at the 2010 Asian Games
Medalists at the 2014 Asian Games

People from Shizuoka Prefecture